was a Japanese mycologist.

References

1881 births
1964 deaths
Japanese mycologists
Japanese phytopathologists